Pierre-André Bissonnette (died 23 December 1989) was a Canadian diplomat. He was concurrently appointed as Acting High Commissioner to Malaya and Malaysia and Chargé d'Affaires a.i. to Myanmar.

Bissonnette also served as chairman of the International Joint Commission.

In 1989 Bissonnette was appointed an Officer of the Order of Canada. He died from cancer two days later.

References

External links 
 Foreign Affairs and International Trade Canada Complete List of Posts 

Year of birth missing
1989 deaths
High Commissioners of Canada to Malaysia
Ambassadors of Canada to Myanmar
Officers of the Order of Canada